Oluwaseun Temitope Osewa (December 17, 1982) is a Nigerian internet entrepreneur. He is the founder of Nairaland, a popular internet forum launched in March 2005, which was projected as the biggest African forum by Forbes. YNaija listed him as one of the most innovative Nigerians in technology. He was also listed among T.I.N Magazine's top 10 most influential Nigerian online entrepreneurs in 2015.

Career
Seun started Nairaland in 2005.

References

Obafemi Awolowo University alumni
Yoruba people
Nigerian former Christians
Nigerian atheists
Nigerian technology businesspeople
Businesspeople from Ogun State
Living people
1982 births
Proud Bigot known for Tribalism